Operation Ivy Blizzard, occurred on 17 December 2003, during the 2003 invasion of Iraq was a counterinsurgent sweep of the Iraqi town of Samarra (part of the Sunni Triangle). The operation involved elements of the U.S. 4th Infantry Division (the 'Ivy' Division) and began before dawn, lasting to about mid-morning. The raids during the operation resulted in many arrests of believed guerrilla fighters and suspected terrorists.

Operation details
The 4th Infantry Division and Task Force Ironhorse initiated Operation Ivy Blizzard, a joint operation with Iraqi security forces within Samarra at the request of local leadership, according to U.S. Central Command officials.

The operation is a combined effort to target, isolate and eliminate former regime elements and other anti-Coalition cells that continue to try to destabilize Iraq and intimidate innocent Iraqi citizens who choose freedom over tyranny.

Saddam Hussein's capture is one of the most significant events in Iraq's progress as the country continues to advance towards realizing its potential. However, there are still those who would deny Iraq this opportunity. Operation Ivy Blizzard will target those former regime elements that held power for decades at the expense of Iraq's future.

Another goal of the operation is for Task Force Ironhorse to engage the Samarran community leadership, identify infrastructure repair priorities, and fund projects to improve quality of life, stimulate economic growth and further strengthen and empower the local government.

Operation Ivy Blizzard is a comprehensive, coordinated and offensive regiment of isolation of insurgents and extremists. The purpose of this objective is to deny anti-Coalition elements freedom of movement, communication and organization while providing innocent citizens a stable environment free from reprisals and indiscriminate violence of former regime loyalists. Swift, decisive action will be taken against those who flagrantly disregard the rule of law and commit crimes against the Coalition and their fellow Iraqis.

Additional phases of the operation include recruiting and training Iraqi Civil Defense Corps soldiers and local police, and empowering Iraqi governmental leadership in their efforts to successfully transition to a free and democratic society.

Ivy Blizzard was launched just days after Operation Red Dawn, which resulted in the capture of Saddam Hussein, which has led some to believe that information that led to Operation Ivy Blizzard may have been obtained from Saddam.

Participating units

American units
U.S. 4th Infantry Division
 244th Engineer Battalion
 720th MP Battalion

Iraqi units
Iraqi security forces

See also

War related articles
Iraq War
Iraq Military Operations 2003 to Current – Alphabetical

Iraq related articles
Iraq
History of Iraq

Terrorism, bombings and insurgency
Terrorism
Iraq Insurgency
Suicide bombings in Iraq since 2003
Bombings and terrorist attacks of the Iraq War
Terrorist attacks of the Iraq War

Casualties
United States casualties of war
Post-traumatic stress disorder
Iraq Body Count project
Violence against academics in post-invasion Iraq

External links
Central Command Press Release
Global Security
Defend America News

Military operations of the Iraq War involving the United States
Military operations of the Iraq War involving Iraq
Military operations of the Iraq War in 2003
Iraqi insurgency (2003–2011)
Conflicts in 2003